Edmund Sheffield may refer to:

Edmund Sheffield (MP for Aldborough) (c.1566–1615), MP for Aldborough, 1604
Edmund Sheffield, 2nd Duke of Buckingham and Normanby (1716–1735), English nobleman
Edmund Sheffield, 1st Earl of Mulgrave (c. 1564–1646), British peer and Member of Parliament
Edmund Sheffield, 2nd Earl of Mulgrave (1611–1658), English peer
Edmund Sheffield, 1st Baron Sheffield (1521–1549), English nobleman